Walter Perry Johnson (November 6, 1887 – December 10, 1946), nicknamed "Barney" and "The Big Train", was an American professional baseball player and manager. He later served as manager of the Senators from 1929 through 1932 and of the Cleveland Indians from 1933 through 1935.

Often thought of as one of the greatest pitchers in baseball history, Johnson established several pitching records, some of which remain unbroken nine decades after he retired from baseball. He remains by far the all-time career leader in shutouts with 110, second in wins with 417, and fourth in complete games with 531. He held the career record in strikeouts for nearly 56 years, with 3,508, from the end of his career in 1927 until the 1983 season, when three players (Steve Carlton, Nolan Ryan and Gaylord Perry) finally passed the mark. Johnson was the only player in the 3,000 strikeout club (achieved July 22, 1923) until Bob Gibson recorded his 3,000th strikeout on July 17, 1974. He also has the most innings pitched among all 18 members of the 3,000 strikeout club, as well as the lowest strikeouts per nine innings pitched (5.34 K/9). Johnson led the league in strikeouts a Major League record 12 times—one more than current strikeout leader Nolan Ryan—including a record eight straight seasons. He is the only pitcher in Major League history to record over 400 wins and strike out over 3,500 batters.

In , Johnson was elected into the Baseball Hall of Fame as one of its "first five" inaugural members. His gentle nature was legendary, and to this day he is held up as an example of good sportsmanship, while his name has become synonymous with friendly competition.

Early life
Walter Johnson was the second of six children (Effie, Leslie, Earl, Blanche) born to Frank Edwin Johnson (1861–1921) and Minnie Olive Perry (1867–1967) on a rural farm four miles west of Humboldt, Kansas. Although he was sometimes said to be of Swedish ancestry and referred to by sportswriters as "The Big Swede", Johnson's ancestors came from the British Isles.

Soon after he reached his fourteenth birthday, his family moved to California's Orange County in 1902. The Johnsons settled in the town of Olinda, a small oil boomtown located just east of Brea. In his youth, Johnson split his time among playing baseball, working in the nearby oil fields, and going horseback riding. Johnson later attended Fullerton Union High School where he struck out 27 batters during a 15-inning game against Santa Ana High School. He later moved to Idaho, where he doubled as a telephone company employee and a pitcher for a team in Weiser, Idaho, of the Idaho State League. Johnson was spotted by a talent scout and signed a contract with the Washington Senators in July 1907 at the age of 19.

Professional career
Johnson was renowned as the premier power pitcher of his era. Ty Cobb recalled his first encounter with the rookie fastballer:

Johnson, moreover, pitched with a sidearm motion, whereas power pitchers are usually known for pitching with a straight-overhand delivery. Johnson's motion was especially difficult for right-handed batters to follow, as the ball seemed to be coming from third base. His pitching mechanics were superb, generating powerful rotation of his shoulders with excellent balance. In addition to his fastball, Johnson featured an occasional curveball that he developed around 1913 or 1914. He batted and threw right-handed.

The overpowering fastball was the primary reason for Johnson's exceptional statistics, especially his fabled strikeout totals. Johnson's record total of 3,508 strikeouts stood for more than 55 years until Nolan Ryan, Steve Carlton, and Gaylord Perry all surpassed it in that order during the 1983 season. Johnson, as of 2017, ranks ninth on the all-time strikeout list, but his total must be understood in its proper context of an era of much fewer strikeouts. Among his pre–World War II contemporaries, only two men finished within 1,000 strikeouts of Johnson: runner-up Cy Young with 2,803 (705 strikeouts behind) and Tim Keefe at 2,562 (946 behind). Bob Feller, whose war-shortened career began in 1936, later ended up with 2,581.

As a right-handed pitcher for the Washington Nationals/Senators, Walter Johnson won 417 games, the second most by any pitcher in history (after Cy Young, who won 511). He and Young are the only pitchers to have won 400 games.

In a 21-year career, Johnson had twelve 20-win seasons, including ten in a row. Twice, he topped 30 wins (33 in 1912 and 36 in 1913). Johnson's record includes 110 shutouts, the most in baseball history. Johnson had a 38–26 record in games decided by a 1–0 score; both his wins and losses in these games are major league records. Johnson also lost 65 games because his teams failed to score a run. On September 4, 5 and 7, 1908, he shut out the New York Highlanders in three consecutive games.

Three times, Johnson won the triple crown for pitchers (1913, 1918 and 1924). Johnson twice won the American League Most Valuable Player Award (1913, 1924), a feat accomplished since by only two other pitchers, Carl Hubbell in 1933 and 1936 and Hal Newhouser in 1944 and 1945.

His earned run average of 1.14 in 1913 was the fourth-lowest ever at the time he recorded it; it remains the sixth-lowest today, despite having been surpassed by Bob Gibson in 1968 (1.12) for lowest ERA ever by a 300+ inning pitcher. It could have been lower if not for one of manager Clark Griffith's traditions. For the last game of the season, Griffith often treated the fans to a farce game. Johnson actually played center field that game until he was brought in to pitch. He allowed two hits before he was taken out of the game. The next pitcher—who was actually a career catcher—allowed both runners to score. The official scorekeeper ignored the game, but later, Johnson was charged with those two runs, raising his ERA from 1.09 to 1.14. For the decade from 1910 to 1919, Johnson averaged 26 wins per season and had an overall ERA of 1.59.

Johnson won 36 games in 1913, 40% of the team's total wins for the season. In April and May, he pitched 55.2 consecutive scoreless innings, still the American League record and the third-longest streak in history. He won 25 games and lost 20 games in 1916, the last pitcher to win and lose 20 in a season until knuckleballer Wilbur Wood did so in 1973. In May 1918, Johnson pitched 40 consecutive scoreless innings; he is the only pitcher with two such 40+ inning streaks.

Although he often pitched for losing teams during his career, Johnson finally led the Washington Senators to the World Series in 1924, his 18th year in the American League. Johnson lost the first and fifth games of the 1924 World Series, but became the hero by pitching four scoreless innings of relief in the seventh and deciding game, winning in the 12th inning. Washington returned to the World Series the following season, but Johnson's experience was close to the inverse: two early wins, followed by a game seven loss. On October 15, 1927, Johnson's request for an unconditional release from the club was granted.

Johnson's Hall of Fame plaque reads that he pitched "for many years with a losing team." While the Senators had only nine winning seasons during his career, they finished in the first division (i. e., fourth place or higher) 11 times, and the second division 10 times. In Johnson's first five seasons, Washington finished last twice and next-to-last three times. But they finished second in the American League in both 1912 and 1913, which were Johnson's two 30-win seasons. Then, for the next decade, they typically finished in the middle of the pack before their back-to-back pennants.

Johnson was a good hitter for a pitcher, compiling a career batting average of .235, including a record .433 average in 1925. His 547 career hits are the most by a full-time pitcher. He also made 13 appearances in the outfield during his career. He hit over .200 in 13 of his 21 seasons, hit three home runs in 1914, and hit 12 doubles and a triple in 130 at-bats in 1917. Johnson finished his career with 23 home runs as a pitcher (24 overall, including a pinch-hit home run in 1925), the tenth-highest total for a pitcher in Major League history.

Johnson had a reputation as a kindly person, and made many friends in baseball. As reported in The Glory of Their Times, Sam Crawford was one of Johnson's good friends, and sometimes in non-critical situations, Johnson would ease up so Crawford would hit well against him. This would vex Crawford's teammate Ty Cobb, who could not understand how Crawford could hit the great Johnson so well. Johnson was also friendly with Babe Ruth, despite Ruth's having hit some of his longest home runs off him at Griffith Stadium.

In 1928, he began his career as a manager in the minor leagues, managing the Newark Bears of the International League. He continued on to the major leagues, managing the Washington Senators (1929–1932), and finally the Cleveland Indians (1933–1935). His managing record was 529–432, with his best team managed being in 1930, when the team finished 94–60, 8 games out of first place. In seven seasons, he had five winning seasons, with the only two losing seasons being at the beginning of his tenure with Washington and Cleveland, though his teams did not come close to winning the pennant, finishing 12 games behind in his last season. Johnson also served as a radio announcer on station WJSV for the Senators during the 1939 season.

Baseball Hall of Fame

Johnson was one of the first five players elected to the Baseball Hall of Fame in 1936. Johnson, Ty Cobb, Christy Mathewson, Babe Ruth and Honus Wagner were known as the "Five Immortals" because they were the first players chosen for the Baseball Hall of Fame.

Politics
Walter Johnson retired to Germantown, Maryland. On 19 February 1936, George Washington's 204th birthday, as a retired baseball legend Johnson gained national publicity. He replicated a feat attributed to Washington by throwing a silver dollar across the Rappahannock River. Though it remained in dispute whether Washington ever did such a thing, Johnson did prove that it could be done.

A lifelong Republican and friend of President Calvin Coolidge, Johnson was elected as a Montgomery County commissioner in 1938. His father-in-law was Rep. Edwin Roberts, a Republican member of the U.S. House of Representatives. In 1940 Johnson ran for a congressional seat in Maryland's 6th district, but came up short against the incumbent Democrat, William D. Byron, by a total of 60,037 (53%) to 52,258 (47%).

Joseph W. Martin, Jr., before he was the Speaker of the United States House of Representatives (1947–1949 and 1953–1955), recruited Johnson to run for Congress. "He was an utterly inexperienced speaker," Martin later said. "I got some of my boys to write two master speeches for him—one for the farmers of his district and the other for the industrial areas. Alas, he got the two confused. He addressed the farmers on industrial problems, and the businessmen on farm problems."

Personal life
Walter married Hazel Lee Roberts on June 24, 1914, and they had five children. Johnson's eldest daughter died from influenza in 1921. His wife died in August 1930 from complications resulting from heat stroke after a long motorcar ride from Kansas. Ty Cobb was a good friend of Johnson, often bringing the pitcher's children gifts when he visited the family.

At 11:40 pm on Tuesday, December 10, 1946, Johnson died of a brain tumor in Washington, D.C., five weeks after his 59th birthday, and was interred at Rockville Cemetery in Rockville, Maryland.

Legacy

Walter Johnson High School in Bethesda, Maryland, is named for him. The monument to him that once stood outside Griffith Stadium has been moved to the school's campus. The school's yearbook is called The Windup and its newspaper is called The Pitch.
A baseball field in Rockville, Maryland is named for him. A wood sculpture of him is located near the field.
A large recreation park (Walter Johnson Park) is named after him in Coffeyville, Kansas, where he maintained a part-time residence for several years.
The Bethesda Big Train, a summer collegiate baseball team based in Bethesda, Maryland, is named in his honor and features a Walter Johnson sculpture in front of their stadium.  A sculpture of sportswriter Shirley Povich and Walter Johnson is located inside the stadium. 

The baseball field in Memorial Park, in Weiser, Idaho, is called Walter Johnson Field.
Johnson was the first American League pitcher to strike out four batters in one inning.
Johnson holds the record for most three-pitch innings by any major league pitcher with four.
In 2009, a statue of Johnson was installed inside the center field gate of Nationals Park along with ones of Frank Howard and Josh Gibson.
Walter Johnson baseball field in Humboldt, Kansas.
Walter Johnson Road in Germantown, Maryland.

Nicknames
He was also called "Sir Walter", "the White Knight", and "The Gentle Johnson" for his gentlemanly sportsmanship, and "Barney" after auto racer Barney Oldfield (he got out of a traffic ticket when a teammate in the car told the policeman Johnson was Barney Oldfield).

Other
In 1999, The Sporting News ranked Johnson number 4 on its list of Baseball's 100 Greatest Players, the highest-ranked pitcher. Later that year, he was elected to the Major League Baseball All-Century Team.

In 1985, Jonathan Richman recorded the song "Walter Johnson", which dwelt on Johnson's personality and behaviour as an exemplar of what can be good in sport.

In 2015, he along with Nap Lajoie, Christy Mathewson and Cy Young were named the "Greatest Pioneers Group." They were voted for by baseball fans online as part of the Franchise Four competition and were "selected as the most impactful players". The results were announced at the 2015 MLB All-Star Game.

Johnson's gentle nature was legendary, and to this day he is held up as an example of good sportsmanship, while his name has become synonymous with friendly competition. This attribute worked to Johnson's disadvantage in the case of fellow Hall of Famer Ty Cobb. Virtually all batters were concerned about being hit by Johnson's fastball, and many would not "dig in" at the plate because of that concern. Cobb realized that the good-hearted Johnson was privately nervous about the possibility of seriously injuring a batter. Almost alone among his peers, Cobb would actually stand closer to the plate than usual when facing Johnson.

Johnson is mentioned in the poem "Line-Up for Yesterday" by Ogden Nash:

Statistics
Career Statistics:

Pitching

Note that official MLB stats show 3,508 career strikeouts, with 70 in his first (1907) season. Stats at the websites of Baseball Hall of Fame, ESPN, Baseball Reference and Baseball Cube (see "External Links", below) all show 3,509 career strikeouts, with 71 in his first season. This has resulted in minor differences seen in references to Johnson's record when reading media and Wikipedia articles of other 3000 strikeout club pitchers.

Hitting

* Strikeouts not counted for batters until 1913 in the AL, 1910 in the NL.

See also

300 win club
3,000 strikeout club
List of Major League Baseball career wins leaders
List of Major League Baseball annual ERA leaders
List of Major League Baseball no-hitters
List of Major League Baseball annual strikeout leaders
List of Major League Baseball annual wins leaders
Top 100 Major League Baseball hit batsmen leaders
Top 100 Major League Baseball strikeout pitchers
List of Major League Baseball all-time leaders in home runs by pitchers
List of Major League Baseball single-inning strikeout leaders
List of Major League Baseball players who spent their entire career with one franchise
Major League Baseball titles leaders
List of Washington Senators Opening Day starting pitchers

Notes

References
 Kavanagh, Jack (1997). Walter Johnson: A Life (Diamond Communications) 

 Thomas, Henry W. (1995). Walter Johnson: Baseball's Big Train (University of Nebraska Press: Bison Books) 
 Treat, Roger L., with contributions by Clark Griffith (1948). Walter Johnson King of the Pitchers (New York: Julian Messner)

Further reading

External links

Baseball Hall of Fame: Washington's 'Big Train' first to 3,000 strike

Baseball Almanac
What Did Walter Johnson's Voice Sound Like? Listen To This 1939 Senators Broadcast.
19-Year-Old Phenom Debuts for Washington: Walter Johnson
Walter Johnson Was a Suffragist
Mr. and Mrs. Walter Johnson Tie the Knot on Monroe St. NW

1887 births
1946 deaths
National Baseball Hall of Fame inductees
Major League Baseball pitchers
Washington Senators (1901–1960) players
Baseball players from Kansas
American athlete-politicians
American League Pitching Triple Crown winners
American League wins champions
American League ERA champions
American League strikeout champions
Cleveland Indians managers
Washington Senators (1901–1960) managers
Major League Baseball broadcasters
Washington Senators (1901–1960) announcers
People from Humboldt, Kansas
People from Brea, California
Maryland Republicans
Deaths from brain cancer in Washington, D.C.
Minor league baseball managers
Newark Bears (IL) players
American people of English descent
People from Germantown, Maryland
Baseball coaches from California
County commissioners in Maryland
People from Bethesda, Maryland
20th-century American politicians
Burials in Maryland